Woman Dancing is an  tall, 450-pound bronze sculpture of a woman by Phillip Levine, installed on the Washington State Capitol campus in Olympia, Washington, United States. The statue was dedicated on February 7, 1976.

References

1976 establishments in Washington (state)
1976 sculptures
Bronze sculptures in Washington (state)
Outdoor sculptures in Olympia, Washington
Sculptures of women in Washington (state)
Statues in Washington (state)
Dance in art